Blair Gavin (born January 8, 1989) is a former American soccer player who is head coach of USL Championship side FC Tulsa.

Career

College and Amateur
Gavin grew up in Scottsdale, Arizona, played club soccer for the Sereno soccer club which was ranked No. 1 in the nation and won the Arizona state cup four years in a row, and attended the famed IMG Academy in Bradenton, Florida, before playing college soccer at the University of Akron. While at Akron, Gavin was named to the Great Lakes Region (GLR) third team and was an All-Mid-American Conference (All-MAC) first team honoree as a sophomore in 2008, while in 2009 he was named to the All-MAC First Team and the All-GLR First Team, and recorded the game-winning penalty kick in a shootout against the University of North Carolina to help his team to the 2009 NCAA Division I championship game.

During his college years Gavin also played three seasons for Bradenton Academics in the USL Premier Development League.

Professional
Gavin was drafted in the first round (10th overall) of the 2010 MLS SuperDraft by Chivas USA. He made his professional debut on April 1, 2010, in a game against Los Angeles Galaxy, and scored his first professional goal - a 20-yard strike from outside the penalty area - in a 4-0 victory over New England Revolution on May 5, 2010.

On August 1, 2012, Gavin, along with a second round pick in the 2013 MLS SuperDraft and allocation money, was traded to New England Revolution in exchange for Shalrie Joseph. Gavin remained with New England through the 2012 season. After the conclusion of the 2012 season, New England declined the 2013 option on Gavin's contract and he entered the 2012 MLS Re-Entry Draft. He became a free agent after going undrafted in both rounds of the draft.

On August 21, 2013, Gavin signed with Seattle Sounders FC after training with the team for several weeks.

International
Gavin has traveled to tournaments in Slovakia, Spain, Portugal and Mexico with the U-18 squad, and was one of 20 players called into the U-18 training camp in January 2007 as the squad prepared for the 14th Copa Chivas Tournament in Mexico.

Personal
Blair is the younger brother of former Los Angeles Galaxy midfielder Michael Gavin.

References

External links
 
 Akron bio

1989 births
Living people
Akron Zips men's soccer players
American soccer players
Association football defenders
Atlanta Silverbacks players
Chivas USA draft picks
Chivas USA players
IMG Academy Bradenton players
Major League Soccer players
New England Revolution players
North American Soccer League players
Phoenix Rising FC players
Portland Timbers 2 players
Seattle Sounders FC players
Soccer players from Scottsdale, Arizona
United States men's under-20 international soccer players
United States men's youth international soccer players
USL Championship players
USL League Two players